Capcom Game Studio Vancouver, Inc. (formerly Blue Castle Games Inc.), more commonly known as Capcom Vancouver, was a Canadian video game developer owned by Capcom with minority stake partnership by Microsoft Studios. As Blue Castle Games, the company was the creator of several successful baseball sports video games, including The Bigs, MLB Front Office Manager and The Bigs 2. They have also developed the Dead Rising series. Blue Castle Games was acquired by Capcom after the release of Dead Rising 2, and renamed Capcom Vancouver, where they continued to work on the Dead Rising series. Capcom announced the closure of the studio in September 2018, cancelling Dead Rising 5 and moving other development to their Japan-based studios.

History

The company was formed on July 4, 2005 in Burnaby, British Columbia, Canada by three core founders with thirty five years of combined video game experience. Starting with only twelve staff and one game (The Bigs), the company grew to 200 people with 3 shipped titles. In February 2008, Blue Castle Games won the award for Best New Video Game Company at the 2008 Elan Awards for The Bigs, in a tie with another local Vancouver company. A wide number of developers in Capcom Vancouver were formerly of EA Vancouver, located only a couple blocks away from their studio. Yoshinori Ono was the studio director from 2011 to 2014.

In February 2018, Capcom had laid off about 30% of the studio, but had continued to use Capcom Vancouver to support Puzzle Fighter on mobile and ongoing work for Dead Rising games. On September 18, 2018, Capcom announced the closure of the studio on reviewing the state of development of current projects. While a skeleton crew will remain through January 2019 to complete certain projects, remaining development work was either cancelled or transitions to Capcom's Japan studios.

Games developed

As Blue Castle Games

As Capcom Vancouver

Cancelled games
 Knights of Aegis (2017)
Dead Rising 5 (2018)

See also
 Capcom
 List of Capcom subsidiaries

References

External links
 

Capcom
Companies based in Burnaby
Canadian companies established in 2005
Canadian companies disestablished in 2018
Video game companies established in 2005
Video game companies disestablished in 2018
Defunct video game companies of Canada
Video game development companies
2005 establishments in British Columbia
2018 disestablishments in British Columbia
Defunct companies of British Columbia
Canadian subsidiaries of foreign companies